The 2010 Girls' Youth South American Volleyball Championship was the 17th edition of the tournament, organised by South America's governing volleyball body, the Confederación Sudamericana de Voleibol (CSV). Held in Tacna, Tarapoto and Callao in Peru. The top two teams qualified for the 2011 Youth World Championship.

Competing nations
The following national teams participated in the tournament, teams were seeded according to how they finished in the previous edition of the tournament with host Peru being seeded first:

First round

Pool A
Venue: Coliseo Cerrado de Tacna, Tacna, Peru

|}

|}

Pool b
Venue: Coliseo Cerrado de Tarapoto, Tarapoto, Peru

|}

|}

Final round
Venue: Coliseo Miguel Grau, Callao, Peru

5th to 8th places bracket

Championship bracket

5th to 8th classification

|}

Semifinals

|}

7th place match

|}

5th place match

|}

3rd place match

|}

Final

|}

Final standing

Individual awards

Most Valuable Player

Best Spiker

Best Blocker

Best Server

Best Digger

Best Setter

Best Receiver

Best Libero

References

External links
CSV official website

2010
S
Volleyball
International volleyball competitions hosted by Peru